Winnie Siu (born 18 December 1993) is a Hong Kong rugby union player. She competed for Hong Kong at the 2017 Women's Rugby World Cup.

Biography 
Siu was named in Hong Kong's training squad in their preparation for the World Cup repechage tournament against Japan and Fiji in 2016. She featured in their match against Fiji as they overwhelmed the Pacific Island nation 45–7.

Siu started in the first test match against Spain in their autumn international tour of 2018. She played in the 2019 Asia Pacific Championship tournament against Fiji and Samoa.

References 

1993 births
Living people
Hong Kong people
Hong Kong rugby union players
Hong Kong female rugby union players